Leslie Michael Jasper (born October 8, 1986) is an American football coach and former player. He is the head football coach at his alma mater,  Bethel University in McKenzie, Tennessee, a position he has held since the 2019 season. Jasper was drafted by the Buffalo Bills of the National Football League (NFL) in the seventh round of the 2011 NFL Draft. He played college football at Bethel as a defensive tackle and offensive guard. Jasper, during his college career, was extremely large even by defensive tackle standards, weighing approximately 450 pounds; he reduced his weight to 375 pounds at the behest of Bills coach Chan Gailey. As of the 2021 NFL Draft, Jasper remains the most recent NFL draft selection from the National Association of Intercollegiate Athletics (NAIA).

Professional career

Buffalo Bills (2011)
Jasper was released prior to the start of the 2011 season in final cuts and was placed on the practice squad. The Bills activated Jasper on December 27, 2011 when tight end Mike Caussin was placed on the injured reserve list. He was waived again by the Bills on August 13, 2012.

Tennessee Titans (2012)
Jasper was signed by the Tennessee Titans on August 15, 2012 but was waived shortly thereafter.

Omaha Nighthawks (2012)
The Nighthawks signed Jasper in September 2012, where he played both ways as a starter on the offensive line and as a nose tackle in the goal-line package on 3rd and 1 situations.

New York Giants (2013)
The Giants signed Jasper to a future contract for 2013. On August 25, 2013, he was cut by the Giants.

Carolina Panthers (2014)
The Panthers signed Jasper to their practice squad on September 11, 2013 and then signed him as a free agent on January 14, 2014.

Coaching career
From 2016 to 2018, Jasper was the offensive line coach at his alma mater, Bethel University. On January 24, 2019, he was named Bethel's head football coach.

Head coaching record

References

External links
 Bethel coaching profile
 Bethel playing profile
 

1986 births
Living people
American football offensive guards
American football defensive tackles
Bethel Wildcats football coaches
Bethel Wildcats football players
Buffalo Bills players
Tennessee Titans players
High school football coaches in New York (state)
High school football coaches in Tennessee
People from Mount Juliet, Tennessee
Coaches of American football from Tennessee
Players of American football from Tennessee
African-American coaches of American football
African-American players of American football
20th-century African-American people
21st-century African-American sportspeople